Trimusculus conicus is an air-breathing sea snail or false limpet, a pulmonate gastropod mollusc in the family Trimusculidae, the button snails.

This species is endemic to eastern and southern Australia, and New Zealand including the Chatham Islands.

Shell description 
The shell  is ovate, conoidal, generally depressed, radiately ribbed, apex rather posterior. The sculpture consists of about 40 subequal narrowly rounded straight riblets, some of which do not extend to the summit. Concentric growth lines are mostly present, and very often produce prominent ridges. The shell colour is white, light-pinkish towards the margin; the interior is white, the margin light pink. The apex is subcentral to nearly marginal, small and distinctly uncinate in well-preserved specimens; anterior and side slopes convex, posterior slope straight, concave, or lightly convex. The interior is shiny with the adductor-scar and siphonal groove distinctly showing. The margin is very slightly crenulate.

 Low form: Length is up to 26 mm, width 22.5 mm, and height 8 mm.
 High form: Length is up to 22 mm, width 18.5 mm, and height 15 mm.

References
This article incorporates public domain text from reference.

Trimusculidae
Gastropods described in 1967
Taxa named by George French Angas
Gastropods of Australia
Gastropods of New Zealand
Fauna of the Chatham Islands